Nicole Arendt and Liezel Huber were the defending champions, but none competed this year.

Teryn Ashley and Abigail Spears won the title by defeating Cara Black and Elena Likhovtseva 6–2, 2–6, 6–0 in the final.

Seeds

Draw

Draw

References
 Main and Qualifying Draws

WTA Auckland Open